Ahmad Maher (born 6 January 1989) is an Egyptian footballer who plays as a right side back for West Bank Premier League side Shabab Al-Dhahiriya SC.

References

1989 births
Egyptian footballers
Living people
Zamalek SC players
Association football defenders